Matthew Boulton (1728–1809) was an English manufacturer and business partner of Scottish engineer James Watt.

Matthew Boulton may also refer to:

People
 Matthew Robinson Boulton (1770–1842), English manufacturer, a pioneer of management and the son of the above
 Matthew Piers Watt Boulton (1820–1894), British classicist, amateur scientist and inventor, son of Matthew Robinson Boulton
 Matthew Boulton (actor) (1893–1962), British actor
 Matthew Boulton (epidemiologist), American 20th and 21st century epidemiologist

Schools
 Matthew Boulton College, amalgamated into Birmingham Metropolitan College

See also
 Matthew Bolton (born 1979), Australian snooker player